The 2010–11 Hazfi Cup was the 24th season of the Iranian football knockout competition. Persepolis was the defending champion.

The cup winner were guaranteed a place in the 2012 AFC Champions League.

Participating teams

Totally 79 teams get permission to participate in the season “2010–11 Hazfi Cup”. These teams are divided into three main groups which are introduced here.

Group 1  (Start their matches from the first/second round)

In total 33 teams (31 teams from 31 different provinces in Iran (each province: one), 1 additional team from Tehran province, and 1 team from Kish).

1- Mehr Karaj (Alborz Province), 2- Parsabad Moghan (Ardabil Province), 3- Hekmati Tabriz (Azerbaijan Sharqi Province), 4- Keyvan Mahabad (Azerbaijan Gharbi Province), 5- Naderi Bushehr (Bushehr Province), 6- Nabard Shahrekord (Chahar Mahaal and Bakhtiari Province), 7- Behineh Rahbar Abadeh (Fars Province), 8- Darousazi Sobhan Rasht (Gilan Province), 9- Heyat Bandar Torkaman (Golestan Province), 10- Zobe-Felezat Hamedan (Hamadan Province), 11- Almahdi Novin Hormozgan (Hormozgan Province), 12- Perspolis Dareshahr (Ilam Province), 13- Heyat Football Isfahan (Isfahan Province), 14- Shahrdari Kahnooj (Kerman Province), 15- Shahrdari Sahneh (Kermanshah Province), 16- Shahrdari Ashkhaneh (Khorasan Shomali Province), 17- Iran-khodro Kashmar(Khorasan Razavi Province), 18- Pehnaei Ghayen (Khorasan Jonoobi Province), 19- Milad Dezful (Khuzestan Province), 20- Shahrdari Gachsaran (Kohgiluyeh and Boyer-Ahmad Province), 21- Persepolis Kamyaran (Kurdistan Province), 22- Dartak Khoramabad (Lorestan Province), 23- Gostaresh Arak (Markazi Province), 24- Naft Mahmoudabad (Mazandaran Province), 25- Takmehr Takestan (Qazvin Province), 26- Panah-afarin Qom (Qom Province), 27- Shahrdari Semnan (Semnan Province), 28- Daneshgah Saravan (Sistan and Baluchistan Province), 29- Shahrdari Ashkezar (Yazd Province), 30- Qezel Ozan Zanjan (Zanjan Province), 31- Babakhani Tehran(Tehran Province), 32- Safir Varamin (Tehran Province / Tavabe)
33- Omran Kish (Kish Island)

Group 2  (Start their matches from the second round)

In total 28 teams (All teams playing in Azadegan League):

1- Aboomoslem Khorasan
, 2- Aluminium Hormozgan
, 3- Bargh Shiraz
, 4- Damash Gilan
, 5- Damash Lorestan
, 6- Esteghlal Ahvaz
, 7- Etka Gorgan
, 8- Foolad Natanz
, 9- Foolad Yazd
, 10- Gol Gohar Sirjan
, 11- Gostaresh Foolad Tabriz
, 12- Hamyari Arak
, 13- Iranjavan Bushehr
, 14- Machine Sazi Tabriz
, 15- Mes Rafsanjan
, 16- Mes Sarcheshme
, 17- Moghavemat Sepasi
, 18- Naft Ahvaz
, 19- Nassaji Mazandaran
, 20- Payam Mashhad
, 21- Payam Mokhaberat Shiraz
, 22- Sanat Sari
, 23- Sanati Kaveh Tehran
, 24- Sepidrood Rasht
, 25- Shahrdari Bandar Abbas
, 26- Shahrdari Yasuj
, 27- Shirin Faraz Kermanshah
, 28- Tarbiat Yazd

Group 3  (Start their matches from the fourth round)

In total 18 teams (All teams playing in Iran Pro League):

1- Esteghlal
, 2- Foolad
, 3- Mes Kerman
, 4- Malavan
, 5- Naft Tehran
, 6- Pas Hamedan
, 7- Paykan
, 8- Persepolis
, 9- Rah Ahan
, 10- Saba
, 11- Saipa
, 12- Sanat Naft Abadan
, 13- Sepahan
, 14- Shahin Bushehr
, 15- Shahrdari Tabriz
, 16- Steel Azin
, 17- Tractor Sazi
, 18- Zob Ahan

First stage 
In the First Stage of “2010–11 Hazfi Cup”, 61 teams will be presented. In this stage three rounds will be done, and finally, 16 teams will be qualified for the Second Stage.

The first round will be started with 10 teams. From this round, 5 teams are allowed to go to the second round. These 5 teams together with the other 51 teams (totally 56 teams) will play in the second round. The winners of second round will play in the third round, and finally, 14 teams will go through the Second Stage (fourth round).

First round

Second round

Third round

Second stage
From this stage the 18 teams from Iran Pro League will be entered into the Main Draw and together with 14 teams from the third round, will start their matches in the fourth round (1/16 Final - Last 32). The 16 winners will continue their matches in a normal draw.

Fourth round (round of 32)

Fifth round (round of 16)

Quarter-Final (1/4 Final - Last 8)

Semi-final (1/2 final – last 4)

Final

The Final match was played in two-legged game in order to determine the Champion of Hazfi Cup 2010–11.

Leg 1

Leg 2

Bracket

Note:     H: Home team,   A: Away team

See also 
 2010–11 Persian Gulf Cup
 2010–11 Azadegan League
 2010–11 Iran Football's 2nd Division
 2010–11 Iran Football's 3rd Division
 2011 Hazfi Cup Final
 Iranian Super Cup
 2010–11 Iranian Futsal Super League

References

Hazfi Cup seasons
Hazfi Cup
Hazfi Cup